The 2016–17 season was PAOK Football Club's 91st in existence and the club's 58th consecutive season in the top flight of Greek football. The team entered the Greek Football Cup and will also compete in UEFA Champions League starting from the third qualifying round.

Club

Board of Directors

Coaching staff  (Technical & Medical)

Players

Squad information

Players in

|}
Total spending:  €5.60M

Players out

1PAOK will receive €6m from the transfer fee due to a sell-on clause included in the deal which took Perez from Thessaloniki to La Coruna

 Total Income: €13.7M

Net income:  €8.1M

Kit

|
|
|
|

Friendlies
All times at CET

Competitions

Overview

Super League Greece

League table

Results summary

Results by round

Matches

Source: paokfc.gr superleaguegreece.net uefa.com

Super League Greece play-offs

League table

Results by round

Matches

Matches

* Match abandoned in the 54th minute with the score at 1–0. It was later rewarded as a 0–3 win for PAOK.

Greek Football Cup

Group stage

Round of 16

Quarter-finals

PAOK won on away goals.

Semi-finals

Final

UEFA Champions League

Third qualifying round

UEFA Europa League

Play-off Round 

All times at CET

Group stage

Knockout round

Round of 32

Statistics

Squad statistics

! colspan="13" style="background:#DCDCDC; text-align:center" | Goalkeepers
|-

! colspan="13" style="background:#DCDCDC; text-align:center" | Defenders
|-

! colspan="13" style="background:#DCDCDC; text-align:center" | Midfielders
|-

! colspan="13" style="background:#DCDCDC; text-align:center" | Forwards
|-

! colspan="13" style="background:#DCDCDC; text-align:center" | Players transferred out during the season
|-

|}
1 Players out on loan

Goalscorers
Match played 2 June 2017.

1Players left the club in (Winter) transfer windows.

Disciplinary record

References

External links
 PAOK FC official website

PAOK FC seasons
PAOK FC season
PAOK FC
PAOK FC